Kara Rud-e Jamshidabad (also Romanized as Karā Rūd-e Jamshīdābād; also known as Dyamshidabad, Jamshīdābād, and Karā Rūd) is a village in Rostamabad-e Jonubi Rural District, in the Central District of Rudbar County, Gilan Province, Iran. At the 2006 census, its population was 401, in 111 families.

References 

Populated places in Rudbar County